Lake Stafford is located in Levy County, Florida with an altitude of .
 It is one of a "few major standing bodies of fresh water in or adjoining Levy County", along with Chunky Pond and
Lake Rousseau, although "there are a number of ponds in these lowlands and perched on aquacludes in the highlands".

References

Stafford
Stafford